The Bagri language (باگڑی/बागड़ी) is a language that forms a dialect bridge between Haryanvi, Rajasthani, and Punjabi and takes its name from the Bagar tract region of Northwestern India. The speakers are mostly in India, with pockets in the Bahawalpur and Bahawalnagar districts of Punjab in Pakistan.

Bagri is a typical Indo-Aryan language akin to Haryanvi, Punjabi and Rajasthani with SOV word order. The most striking phonological feature of Bagri is the presence of three lexical tones: high, mid, and low, akin to Punjabi. The language has a very high (65%) lexical similarity with Haryanvi. According to the 2011 Census, there are 234,227 speakers of Bagri Rajasthani and 1,656,588 speakers of Punjabi Bagri.

Features

Phonology
Bagri distinguishes 31 consonants including a retroflex series, 10 vowels, 2 diphthongs and 3 tones.

Declension
There are two numbers: singular and plural.
Two genders: masculine and feminine.
Three cases: simple, oblique, and vocative.  Case marking is partly inflectional and partly postpositional.
Nouns are declined according to their final segments.
All pronouns are inflected for number and case but gender is distinguished only in the third person singular pronouns.
The third person pronouns are distinguished on the proximity/remoteness dimension in each gender.
Adjectives are of two types: either ending in /-o/ or not.
Cardinal numbers up to ten are inflected.
Both present and past participles function as adjectives.

Verbs
There are three tenses and four moods.

Syntax
Sentence types are of traditional nature.
Coordination and subordination are very important in complex sentences.
Parallel lexicon are existing and are very important from sociolinguistic point of view.

Samples

Work on Bagri 
Grierson, G. A. 1908. (Reprint 1968). Linguistic Survey of India. Volume IX, Part II. New Delhi: Motilal Banarasidass
Gusain, Lakhan. 1994. Reflexives in Bagri. M.Phil. dissertation. New Delhi: Jawaharlal Nehru University
Gusain, Lakhan. 1999. A Descriptive Grammar of Bagri. Ph.D. dissertation. New Delhi: Jawaharlal Nehru University
Gusain, Lakhan. 2000a. Limitations of Literacy in Bagri. Nicholas Ostler & Blair Rudes (eds.). Endangered Languages and Literacy. Proceedings of the Fourth FEL Conference. University of North Carolina, Charlotte, 21–24 September 2000
Gusain, Lakhan. 2000b. Bagri Grammar. Munich: Lincom Europa (Languages of the World/Materials, 384)
Gusain, Lakhan. 2008. Bagri Learners' Reference Grammar. Ann Arbor, Michigan: Northside Publishers
Wilson, J. 1883. Sirsa Settlement Report. Chandigarh: Government Press

Gallery
Regions where Bagri is spoken:

See also
Rajasthani language
List of winners of Sahitya Akademi Awards for writing in Rajasthani language
List of Rajasthani poets
List of Indian poets#Rajasthani

References

Bibliography

External links 
Centre for Rajasthani Studies

Haryanavi culture
Languages of Rajasthan
Languages of Punjab, India
Languages of Punjab, Pakistan
Rajasthani languages
Languages of Sindh
Tonal languages in non-tonal families